The Welsh Premier Division, known for sponsorship reasons as the Indigo Group Premiership, (Uwch Gynghrair grŵp indigo) is a rugby union league in Wales first implemented by the Welsh Rugby Union (WRU) for the 1990–91 season.

Competition history
Ahead of the 1990–91 season, the Welsh Rugby Union announced that the top 38 clubs would play in the Heineken National League, split into four divisions with the top ten teams forming the Premier League. Each club would play each other home and away in a double round-robin format. The ten teams that were part of the inaugural Premier Division were Abertillery, Cardiff, Bridgend, Glamorgan Wanderers. Llanelli, Neath, Newbridge, Pontypool, Pontypridd and Swansea.

For the 1999–2000, 2000–01 and 2001–02 seasons, it was reformatted as the Welsh-Scottish League with the addition of Edinburgh and Glasgow alongside the Welsh teams; and run jointly by the Scottish Rugby Union and the Welsh Rugby Union.

Originally at the top tier of rugby in Wales, the league lost this status in 2003 with the implementation of the WRU's "Regional Rugby" plan, by which the country would be represented in top-level competitions, i.e. the Celtic League (now URC) and Heineken Cup, by five (now four) regionally based sides. The clubs in the Premier Division became largely developmental sides for the regional teams.

Over succeeding years the league structure was to be changed in order to strengthen the structure of the semi-pro sides feeding the regions. Under the WRU's plan, playing records and facilities will be the main criteria in determining which clubs would stay in the Premiership.

In the 2005–06 season the Welsh Premier Division consisted of 16 clubs. Division One Champions Maesteg and runners-up Glamorgan Wanderers were promoted from Division 1 to join 14 clubs who played Premiership rugby the previous season. The clubs relegated down to Division 1 were Caerphilly, Llanharan and Newbridge, thus, reducing the division from 17 to 16 clubs.

For the 2006–07 season, the Welsh Premier Division was reduced once more to 14 teams. The 2006–07 league was won by Neath RFC, making it three wins in three years.

For the 2007–08 season, a new points system was adopted, following the same system used in the Celtic League, where teams earn four points for a win and two for a draw, and can earn bonus points for either scoring four tries or losing by less than seven points. The relegation rules also changed during the season, stating that if a team failed to meet ground and facility standards during the season, then that club would fall into the final place rather than the club that finished last through points.

British and Irish Cup Qualification

In 2009–10, the top six clubs from the 2008–09 season qualified for the new British and Irish Cup competition. A play-off system was added at the end of the season for the top eight sides to qualify for the following season's British and Irish Cup. Only six teams can qualify for this from the eight. These play-offs do not decide the League Championship, as the league leaders at the end of the regular 26 game season will be Champions.

At the start of the 2010–11 season, it was announced that the Welsh Premiership title would be settled by a play-off at a neutral ground. At the end of the season, play-offs will involve the second and third placed teams meeting at a neutral venue, with the winners facing the team who finished top after the regular season in the final. Two-other play-off issues are also set to feature at the end of the campaign. The top five teams in the league will win automatic entry into the following season's British and Irish Cup with the sixth and final place decided by a play-off. This will see the teams finishing in 7th and 8th position meeting for the right to play the sixth-placed club.

Promotion from Division 1 was revamped from the 2010–11 season with play-offs taking place for this too. The bottom-placed team in the Welsh Premiership was grouped with the respective division winners in Division 1 East, North and West - provided they meet the Premiership criteria.

For the 2012–13 season, it was announced that the Premier Division would be reduced to 10 teams. The teams for the league would be decided on three factors: the holding of an 'A Licence' based on stadium criteria; the signing of a 'Participation Agreement'; and league results over the previous six seasons. It was announced that four clubs, Pontypool, Tonmawr, Bridgend and Carmarthen had not achieved the required criteria to be included into the new league. However, pressure from Ospreys and Scarlets backers led to the league being extended to 12 teams with Bridgend and Carmarthen included. Tonmawr, citing financial reasons, opted not to take part in the new league at all and re-entered themselves into Division Six. Pontypool launched a legal challenge to avoid being the only team relegated but lost the case.

Past Premier Division winners

Premier Division champions by season
*= Welsh-Scottish League winners

Premier Division wins by club

 Cardiff RFC were leading the 2019-20 table before the season was cancelled due to the COVID-19 pandemic, but the championship was withheld.

See also

 WRU Challenge Cup
 United Rugby Championship
 British and Irish Cup
 List of Welsh rugby union teams
 WRU National Leagues

References

 
2
1990 establishments in Wales
Sports leagues established in 1990
Rugby union leagues in Europe
Wales
Professional sports leagues in the United Kingdom